The Lodge Halt railway station was a station in Brymbo, Wrexham, Wales. The station was opened on 1 July 1906 and closed on 1 January 1931.

References

Further reading

Disused railway stations in Wrexham County Borough
Railway stations in Great Britain opened in 1906
Railway stations in Great Britain closed in 1931
Former Great Western Railway stations